Zdzisław Sosnowski (23 February 1924 – 9 November 2018) was a Polish professional footballer who played for Fortu Bema Warszawa, Pawianka Warszawa, Korona Warszawa, KS Warszawianka, Polonia Warsaw and Legia Warsaw, as a goalkeeper.

References

1924 births
2018 deaths
Polish footballers
KS Warszawianka players
Polonia Warsaw players
Legia Warsaw players
Ekstraklasa players
Association football goalkeepers